David Damrosch is an American literary historian, was born in Maine and raised there and in New York , currently the Ernest Bernbaum Professor at Harvard University and an Elected Fellow of the American Academy of Arts & Sciences.

Damrosch studied at Yale University, receiving his BA in 1975 and his PhD in 1980. He taught at Columbia University from 1980 until 2009 when he moved to Harvard University. He founded the Institute for World Literature in 2010 and has previously been the president of the American Comparative Literature Association.

References

Year of birth missing (living people)
Living people
Harvard University faculty
American literary historians
Yale College alumni
Yale Graduate School of Arts and Sciences alumni